Magic Village (French: Village magique, Italian:Vacanze d'amore) is a 1955 French-Italian comedy film directed by Jean-Paul Le Chanois and starring Robert Lamoureux, Lucia Bosè and Hélène Rémy. Robert, a Parisian, is planning a holiday in Sicily with his new fiancée. However his work means he has to follow on a later train than his fiancée. While travelling he meets Lucienne an attractive Sicilian girl.

Cast
 Robert Lamoureux as Robert  
 Lucia Bosé as Thérèse Miceli  
 Hélène Rémy as Lucienne Dumas  
 Delia Scala as Agatina  
 Walter Chiari as Momo  
 Umberto Spadaro as Don Puglisi  
 Jacqueline Plessis as Colette  
 Giovanni Grasso as Sindaco  
 Domenico Modugno as Un frère d'Agatina  
 Renato Chiantoni 
 Yvon Jeanclaude as Pierre 
 Giannina Chiantoni 
 Germaine de France 
 Judith Magre
 Jany Vallières 
 René Clermont as L'homme chiffres  
 Jean Péméja 
 Jeanine Papoudoff 
 Robert Rollis 
 Clio Sally 
 Françoise Hornez 
 Jacques Riberolles 
 Michel Le Royer 
 Pippo Valente 
 Rina Franchetti 
 Pascale Roberts 
 Christiane Dancourt 
 Brigitte Elloy 
 Colette Jongleux
 Georges Chamarat 
 Véronique Deschamps 
 Jean-Paul Le Chanois
 Michel Lemoine 
 Barbara Mayo 
 Marcelle Praince
 Vittoria Crispo as Agatina's mother

References

Bibliography 
 Michele Sancisi. Walter Chiari: un animale da palcoscenico. Mediane, 2011.

External links 
 

1955 films
Italian comedy films
French comedy films
1955 comedy films
1950s French-language films
Films set in Sicily
Films directed by Jean-Paul Le Chanois
Films scored by Joseph Kosma
1950s French films
1950s Italian films